The 1987 Cork Senior Hurling Championship was the 99th staging of the Cork Senior Hurling Championship since its establishment by the Cork County Board in 1887. The championship began on 23 May 1987 and ended on 25 October 1987.

Midleton entered the championship as the defending champions.

The final was played on 25 October 1987 at Páirc Uí Chaoimh in Cork, between Midleton and Na Piarsaigh, in what was their first ever meeting in the final. Midleton won the match by 2-12 to 0-15 to claim their fifth championship title overall and a second title in succession.

Na Piarsaigh's Mickey Mullins was the championship's top scorer with 0-33.

Seeding

Seeding was introduced in the draw for the championship after being advocated by County Secretary Frank Murphy for the previous two years. The system of seeding was introduced to safeguard the financial potential of the championship and to avoid "lop-sided" finals. After some debate, Blackrock, Glen Rovers, Midleton and St. Finbarr's were deemed to be the four strongest clubs and were separated.

Team changes

To Championship

Promoted from the Cork Intermediate Hurling Championship
 Cloughduv

Results

First round

Quarter-finals

Semi-finals

Final

Championship statistics

Top scorers

Top scorers overall

Top scorers in a single game

References

Cork Senior Hurling Championship
Cork Senior Hurling Championship